This page details the all-time statistics, records, and other achievements pertaining to the Milwaukee Bucks.

Individual awards

NBA MVP
Kareem Abdul-Jabbar – 1971, 1972, 1974
Giannis Antetokounmpo – 2019, 2020

NBA Finals MVP
Kareem Abdul-Jabbar – 1971
Giannis Antetokounmpo – 2021

NBA Defensive Player of the Year
Sidney Moncrief – 1983, 1984
Giannis Antetokounmpo  – 2020
NBA Rookie of the Year
Kareem Abdul-Jabbar – 1970
Malcolm Brogdon – 2017

NBA Most Improved Player
Giannis Antetokounmpo – 2017

NBA Sixth Man of the Year
Ricky Pierce – 1987, 1990

NBA Sportsmanship Award
Jrue Holiday – 2021

NBA Coach of the Year
Don Nelson – 1983, 1985
Mike Budenholzer – 2019

NBA Executive of the Year
John Hammond – 2010
Jon Horst – 2019

NBA Teammate of the Year
Jrue Holiday – 2022

All-NBA First Team
Kareem Abdul-Jabbar – 1971–1974
Marques Johnson – 1979
Sidney Moncrief – 1983
Giannis Antetokounmpo – 2019-2022

All-NBA Second Team
Kareem Abdul-Jabbar – 1970
Oscar Robertson – 1971
Marques Johnson – 1980, 1981
Sidney Moncrief – 1982, 1984, 1985, 1986
Terry Cummings – 1985
Giannis Antetokounmpo – 2017, 2018

All-NBA Third Team
Terry Cummings – 1989
Vin Baker – 1997
Ray Allen – 2001
Michael Redd – 2004
Andrew Bogut – 2010

NBA All-Defensive First Team
Kareem Abdul-Jabbar – 1974, 1975
Sidney Moncrief – 1983–1986
Paul Pressey – 1985, 1986
Alvin Robertson – 1991
Giannis Antetokounmpo – 2019, 2020, 2021, 2022
Eric Bledsoe – 2019
Jrue Holiday – 2021

NBA All-Defensive Second Team
Kareem Abdul-Jabbar – 1970, 1971
Quinn Buckner – 1978, 1980, 1981, 1982
Sidney Moncrief – 1982
Paul Pressey – 1987
Alvin Robertson – 1990
Giannis Antetokounmpo – 2017
Eric Bledsoe – 2020
Brook Lopez – 2020
Jrue Holiday – 2022

NBA All-Rookie First Team
Kareem Abdul-Jabbar – 1970
Bob Dandridge – 1970
Marques Johnson – 1978
Vin Baker – 1994
Glenn Robinson – 1995
Andrew Bogut – 2005
Brandon Jennings – 2010
Malcolm Brogdon – 2017

NBA All-Rookie Second Team
Ray Allen – 1997
T. J. Ford – 2004
Giannis Antetokounmpo – 2014

NBA All-Star Weekend
NBA All-Star selections
Jon McGlocklin – 1969
Flynn Robinson – 1970
Kareem Abdul-Jabbar – 1970–1975
Oscar Robertson – 1971, 1972
Bob Dandridge – 1973, 1975, 1976
Jim Price – 1975
Brian Winters – 1976, 1978
Marques Johnson – 1979, 1980, 1981, 1983
Bob Lanier – 1982
Sidney Moncrief – 1982–1986
Terry Cummings – 1985, 1989
Ricky Pierce – 1991
Alvin Robertson – 1991
Vin Baker – 1995, 1996, 1997
Glenn Robinson – 2000, 2001
Ray Allen – 2000, 2001, 2002
Michael Redd – 2004
Giannis Antetokounmpo – 2017–2023
Khris Middleton – 2019, 2020, 2022
Jrue Holiday – 2023

All-Star Most Valuable Player
Giannis Antetokounmpo – 2021

NBA All-Star head coaches
Larry Costello – 1971, 1974
Mike Budenholzer – 2019

Franchise records 
(As of the end of the 2021–22 season)

Bold denotes still active with team.

Italic denotes still active, but not with team.

Games played

Minutes played

Points

Rebounds

Assists

Steals

Blocks

Field goals

3–Pt Field goals

Free throws

Franchise record for championships

References

Accomplishments and records
National Basketball Association accomplishments and records by team